Stathmopodidae is a family of moths in the moth superfamily Gelechioidea described by Edward Meyrick in 1913.

Taxonomy and systematics
Actinoscelis Meyrick, 1912
Aeoloscelis Meyrick, 1897
Arauzona Walker, [1865]
Atrijuglans Yang, 1977
Calicotis Meyrick, 1889
Cuprina Sinev, 1988
Dolophrosynella T. B. Fletcher, 1940
Ethirastis Meyrick, 1921
Eudaemoneura Diakonoff, 1948
Hieromantis Meyrick, 1897
Lamprystica Meyrick, 1914
Minomona Matsumura, 1931
Molybdurga Meyrick, 1897
Mylocera Turner, 1898
Neomariania Mariani, 1943
Oedematopoda Zeller, 1852
Pachyrhabda Meyrick, 1897
Phytophlops Viette, 1958
Pseudaegeria Walsingham, 1889
Snellenia Walsingham, 1889
Stathmopoda Herrich-Schäffer, 1853
Thylacosceles Meyrick, 1889
Thylacosceloides Sinev, 1988
Tinaegeria Walker, 1856
Tortilia Chrétien, 1908
Trychnopepla Turner, 1941
Ursina Sinev, 1988

References

 
Gelechioidea
Moth families